The 1969–70 international cricket season was from September 1969 to April 1970.

Season overview

September

New Zealand in India

October

New Zealand in Pakistan

November

Australia in India

January

Australia in South Africa

References

International cricket competitions by season
1969 in cricket
1970 in cricket